Hosea Ballou D.D. (April 30, 1771 – June 7, 1852) was an American Universalist clergyman and theological writer.

Originally a Baptist, he converted to Universalism in 1789. He preached in a number of towns in Vermont, New Hampshire, and Massachusetts. From 1817, he was pastor of the Second Universalist Church of Boston. He wrote a number of influential theological works, as well as hymns, essays and sermons, and edited two Universalist journals. Ballou has been called one of the fathers of American Universalism.

Life and career
Hosea Ballou was born in Richmond, New Hampshire, to a family of Huguenot origin. The family claimed to be of Anglo-Norman heritage. The son of Maturin Ballou, a Baptist minister, Hosea Ballou was self-educated, and devoted himself early on to the ministry. In 1789 he converted to Universalism, and in 1794 became pastor of a congregation in Dana, Massachusetts. Ballou was also a high-ranking freemason, who attained the position of Junior Grand Warden of the Grand Lodge of New Hampshire in 1811.

Ballou preached at Barnard, Vermont, and surrounding towns in 1801–1807; at Portsmouth, New Hampshire, in 1807–1815; at Salem, Massachusetts, in 1815–1817; and, as pastor of the Second Universalist Church of Boston, from December 1817 until his death there. He was buried at the Mount Auburn Cemetery.

He founded and edited The Universalist Magazine (1819–later called The Trumpet), and The Universalist Expositor (1831–later The Universalist Quarterly Review), and wrote about 10,000 sermons as well as many hymns, essays and polemic theological works. He is best known for Notes on the Parables (1804), A Treatise on Atonement (1805) and Examination of the Doctrine of a Future Retribution (1834). These works mark him as the principal American expositor of Universalism.

Ballou married Ruth Washburn; children included Maturin Murray Ballou.  He is the grand-uncle of Hosea Ballou II, the first president of Tufts University.

Beliefs
Ballou has been called the "father of American Universalism," along with John Murray, who founded the first Universalist church in America. Ballou, sometimes called an "Ultra Universalist," differed from Murray in that he divested Universalism of every trace of Calvinism, and opposed legalism and trinitarian views. As he wrote, "Real happiness is cheap enough, yet how dearly we pay for its counterfeit."

Ballou also preached that those forms of Christianity that emphasized God as wrathful in turn hardened the hearts of their believers:

See also
 New Hampshire Historical Marker No. 59: Hosea Ballou

References
Notes

Bibliography
Universalist Quarterly and General Review, Volumes 11–12, pg. 176

Further reading
 Universalist Magazine. v.9 (Boston: Henry Bowen, Province House Row, 1827)
 
 M.M. Ballou. Biography of Rev. Hosea Ballou. Boston : A. Tompkins, 1852. Google books
 M.M. Ballou. Life story of Hosea Ballou: for the young. Boston: A. Tompkins, 1854. Illustrations by Billings. Internet Archive
 Oscar F. Safford. Hosea Ballou: a marvellous life-story, 4th ed. Boston: Universalist Pub. House, 1890. Google books
Bressler, Ann Lee.  The Universalist Movement in America, 1770–1880.  New York: Oxford University Press, 2001.

External links

The Ballou family papers are in the Harvard Divinity School Library at Harvard Divinity School in Cambridge, Massachusetts.

The historical papers and sermons of Hosea Ballou are in the Harvard Divinity School Library at Harvard Divinity School in Cambridge, Massachusetts.
 in 
 at 
 
 

1771 births
1852 deaths
Writers from Boston
Clergy from Boston
19th-century American people
Writers from Salem, Massachusetts
Writers from Portsmouth, New Hampshire
Baptists from New Hampshire
People from Windsor County, Vermont
American Christian theologians
Clergy of the Universalist Church of America
Christian radicals
18th-century Christian universalists
19th-century Christian universalists
Christian universalist theologians
Burials at Mount Auburn Cemetery
People from Richmond, New Hampshire
Former Baptists